Topçu (also, Topchi, Topchu, and Torchu) is a village and municipality in the Ismailli Rayon of Azerbaijan.  It has a population of 1,431.

References 

Populated places in Ismayilli District